A gasket (correct terminology is a "joint" made from "jointing material") is a mechanical seal that fills the space between two mating surfaces.

Gasket may also refer to:
 Flange gasket, a type of gasket made to fit between two sections of pipe
 Head gasket, a gasket used in internal combustion engines
 Gasket (sailing), a rope used to hold a stowed sail in place
 Apollonian gasket, a fractal generated from triples of circles
 Sierpinski gasket, a fractal generated from triangles
 The Gaskets, U.S. synth-pop/rock band
 Gasket Studios, a visual effects studio.